was a general in the Imperial Japanese Army, and is considered the father of modern Japanese cavalry. He was older brother to Vice Admiral Akiyama Saneyuki

Biography

Early life
Born as the third son to a poor samurai in the Matsuyama Domain, Iyo Province (modern Ehime Prefecture), Akiyama's family was so poor in his childhood that he was forced to work as a fire stoker and janitor in a local public bathhouse for a pittance each day.

Akiyama entered the Rikugun Shikan Gakkō (the forerunner of the Imperial Japanese Army Academy) in 1877. He went on to attend the Army Staff College, and was sent as a military attaché to France to study cavalry tactics and techniques. He was the only Japanese officer sent to study at the École spéciale militaire de Saint-Cyr at a time when the rest of the Japanese Army had turned to the Imperial German Army as its model and was being taught by instructors from Germany.

Akiyama had very pale skin and large eyes, and was often mistaken for a European student by many foreign instructors such as Jakob Meckel while at the Japanese Army Academy. During his stay in France, Akiyama developed a reputation as a “ladies' man”, much to the envy of his colleagues. Akiyama himself apparently disliked his attractive looks. He was reputed to be a plain-living person who had a bowl of rice with slices of pickles for his meal. However, he spent his money on sake and had a reputation as a heavy drinker.

Military career

Akiyama was active in the First Sino-Japanese War of 1894–1895 as a cavalry regimental commander in the IJA 1st Division, and served with Japanese expeditionary forces in the subsequent Boxer Rebellion with the IJA 5th Division. In the Russo-Japanese War of 1904–1905, he led his troops in the Battle of Shaho, Battle of Sandepu, and in the Battle of Mukden against the Cossack cavalry divisions of the Imperial Russian Army. In April 1906, he was awarded the Order of the Golden Kite (2nd class).

Akiyama became commander of the IJA 13th Division in 1913, and after his promotion to full general in 1916, was given command of the Imperial Guards Division. The following year, he was assigned command of the Chōsen Army. In 1920, he became Director General for Military Education.

After he retired from active military service in 1923, declining promotion to Field Marshal, he returned to his native island of Shikoku and became the principal of the Hokuyō Junior High School (present-day Matsuyama High School). Akiyama died of complications from diabetes at the Army Medical School Hospital in Tokyo in 1930, and his grave is in the city of Matsuyama.

Akiyama as an educator
Even today, Akiyama's brilliance in his education career is still celebrated. Akiyama's educational achievements and practice became universally implemented in Japanese schools after nearly 80 years, and has become widely taught in Japanese high school education as of 2020. His teachings will be inherited as an increasingly important basic element in the new Japanese secondary education after 2022.

Akiyama loved children and dreamed of becoming a school teacher. After graduating from the Government Osaka Normal School (currently Osaka University of Education) in July 1876, the 58th Elementary School in Kawachi Kuni, Sakai Prefecture (currently Neyagawa City Minami) he was immediately selected as a teacher who graduated from an early public normal school, and became a member of the elementary school attached to Aichi Prefectural Normal School (currently Nagoya Elementary School attached to Aichi University of Education), and pioneered compulsory education in Japan. He became a promising person in the field of dissemination. (Japan's public normal schools were first established in each university district from 1897 to 1897 as an institution (leading teacher training institution) to develop human resources to create teacher training schools in each prefecture, and all prefectures were established. The graduate was to be invited as a leading teacher. Akiyama was invited to Aichi Prefecture) However, due to low salary, the living expenses and the needed school expenses of his younger brother, Masayuki, he couldn't guarantee financial stability. Immediately after he got his dream job, he had to give up and turn to a professional military officer.

Akiyama had a love for education so much, he was even involved in the education for the army and contributed to the development of younger generations such as the head of the Army Cavalry Military School, and finally became the inspectorate general of education among the three Secretaries of the Army.

For Akiyama, the position of being a school principal was the happiest he's been involved in a career, far surpassing his time served in the military. Today in Japan, Akiyama is known as an educator with a gentle personality, a leftist who denounces conflict. Akiyama heavily regretted his time serving in the military, and mourned the spirits of his subordinates and the victims during his military era for the rest of his life. Akiyama disliked the totalitarian flow Japan was gradually heading for, and tried his best to hide his military achievements. After assuming the job of a junior high-school principal, students and parents would often ask him to discuss the Russo-Japanese war and show off his military uniform of army general. However, Akiyama regretted his past and vehemently rejected these requests. Akiyama said that "students are not soldiers" and hoped to reduce military training within schools so kids could focus on education.

Akiyama was also described as a "super-educator", in other words, his educative skills were considered "too advanced to understand". His teachings were buried until the end of the century. Akiyama had a regular teacher qualification, and at that time, the principal position of the junior high school was considered an honorary position, so Akiyama was an exceptional case.

During the Great Kanto Earthquake, conspiracies amongst Japanese people about Korean people arose. Japanese people thought that Korean people caused this great tragedy, and created rumors about the supposed genocide Korean people planned on Japanese people. Because of this, many Koreans were hurt, and some even killed. Akiyama devised a school trip to Korea, which was rare at the time. Akiyama implemented the idea due to being distressed by the massacre of Koreans in the Great Kanto Earthquake, and he wanted his students to understand that these were merely rumors, and foster the understanding and respect of the students for different cultures.

Akiyama's education is an important part of Japan's high school education today. Japanese secondary school education is being reformed by removing it's military content, due to the courtesy of Akiyama's teachings. The traditional culture of each secondary school in Japan is inherited by each new high school and continues to this day.

These educational policies and practices of Akiyama are still listed in the current principal's office of Ehime Prefectural Matsuyama Kita High School as Akiyama's handwritten "Roughness and Laziness" (to warn each other of their rough and lazy hearts). The school's educational policy is as quoted, "We value independence, enterprising, and respect, cultivate rich humanity and sociality, and aim to enhance education that makes the most of individuality and abilities. Fostering people with an international sense who can contribute to a peaceful international society."

Portrayals in fiction
Akiyama is one of the main characters of Saka no Ue no Kumo ("Clouds Over the Slope"), a novel by Ryōtarō Shiba, adapted as a historical drama on the Japanese television network NHK from 2009 to 2011. Akiyama was portrayed by actor Hiroshi Abe.

Akiyama inspired the character Dot Pixis in the manga series Attack on Titan. This caused an Internet flame war regarding the general's military actions, specifically, though not exclusively, in Korea. The 2013 controversy included death threats to the manga's creator Hajime Isayama.

Honours
With translated material from the corresponding Japanese Wikipedia article
 Grand Cordon of the Order of the Rising Sun, Paulownia Flowers (1 November 1930, posthumous)
 Order of the Rising Sun, 1st class (29 November 1918)
 Order of the Sacred Treasure, 1st class (28 November 1913)
 Order of the Golden Kite, 2nd class (1 April 1906)
 Grand Officer of the Légion d'honneur
 Commander of the Order of Saints Maurice and Lazarus
 Order of the Red Eagle, 2nd class
 Order of Saint Stanislaus, 2nd Class
 Order of St. Anna, 2nd class

Order of precedence
Senior eighth rank (5 June 1880)
Seventh rank (7 April 1883)
Senior seventh rank (188?)
Sixth rank (11 January 1893)
Senior sixth rank (24 March 1896)
Fifth rank (30 October 1897)
Senior fifth rank (20 October 1902)
Fourth rank (11 November 1907)
Senior fourth rank (28 December 1912)
Third rank (31 January 1916)
Senior third rank (10 March 1919)
Second rank (30 April 1923)

Notes

References

Books

External links 

Portrait and biography at National Diet Library
Akiyama Yoshifuru's Japanese Wiki Page

Akiyama Yoshifuru's Korean Wiki Page

1859 births
1930 deaths
Deaths from diabetes
People from Matsuyama, Ehime
Japanese generals
Japanese military personnel of the First Sino-Japanese War
Japanese military personnel of the Russo-Japanese War
Japanese military personnel of the Boxer Rebellion
People of Meiji-period Japan
École Spéciale Militaire de Saint-Cyr alumni
Grand Cordons of the Order of the Rising Sun
Recipients of the Order of the Sacred Treasure, 2nd class
Recipients of the Order of the Golden Kite
Commandeurs of the Légion d'honneur
Commanders of the Order of Saints Maurice and Lazarus
Recipients of the Order of Saint Stanislaus (Russian), 2nd class
Recipients of the Order of St. Anna, 2nd class